Stripped is the fourth studio album by American singer Christina Aguilera. It was released on October 22, 2002, by RCA Records. Looking to transition from the teen pop styles of her self-titled debut album (1999), Aguilera took creative control over her next album project, both musically and lyrically. She also changed her public image and established her alter ego Xtina. Musically, the record incorporates pop and R&B with influences from many different genres, including soul, rock, hip hop, and Latin music. Lyrically, most of the songs from the album discuss the theme of self-respect, while a few other songs talk about sex and feminism. As an executive producer, Aguilera enlisted numerous new collaborators for the album.

Upon its release, Stripped received generally mixed reviews from music critics; many criticized its lack of musical focus, while some of them called it "almost" an album for grown-ups, with comparisons made to Mariah Carey and Janet Jackson. Commercially, Stripped debuted at number two on the US Billboard 200, with first-week sales of 330,000 copies. It was certified five times platinum by the Recording Industry Association of America (RIAA) for shipping over five million copies in the United States. The album also charted within the top five of charts in Canada, the Netherlands, Ireland, New Zealand and the United Kingdom. It was Aguilera's best-performing album in the United Kingdom, becoming the 29th and 40th bestselling album of the decade and millennium there, respectively, with two million copies sold. Despite its initial critical reception, Stripped received multiple Grammy Award nominations, including one win, and has since gone on to be called one of the most influential albums of all time, inspiring a generation of artists. The album has sold over 12 million copies worldwide, making it one of the best-selling albums of the 21st century.

Five singles were released from the album. The lead single "Dirrty" was met with criticism and controversy due to its sexual music video but was an international hit on the charts. The follow-up "Beautiful" was praised by critics and garnered chart success worldwide. The last three singles,"Fighter", "Can't Hold Us Down" and "The Voice Within", became top-ten hits in various countries. Aguilera performed several songs from Stripped live during a number of shows, notably during the 2002 MTV Europe Music Awards, the American Music Awards of 2003 (January), and the 2003 MTV Video Music Awards. Two concert tours were held in 2003 to promote the album, The Justified & Stripped Tour (co-headlined with Justin Timberlake) and The Stripped Tour.

Background and development

Following the release of her self-titled debut album in 1999, Aguilera had achieved major success with four worldwide hits, including "Genie in a Bottle" and "What a Girl Wants". Following that, she continued to garner major success with "Lady Marmalade" (2001) – a cover of Labelle's song of the same title – which features Lil' Kim, Pink and Mýa. Despite the international success, Aguilera was unsatisfied with the music and image that her former manager Steve Kurtz, had created for her, having been marketed as a bubblegum pop singer because of the genre's financial lure. She mentioned plans for her next album to have more musical and lyrical depth.

By late 2000, Aguilera decided not to continue the contact with Kurtz. After terminating Kurtz's services, Irving Azoff was hired as her new manager. Following the managerial shakeup, Aguilera decided to create her new style of music on the following album. She also used her new alter ego Xtina. She also changed her public appearance and persona, with her hair dyed black and nude photographs on magazine covers. Aguilera further commented about the event with USA Today: "When you're part of a pop phenomenon, you have so many opinions shoved down your throat. People try to tell you what you should do, how you should act, what you should wear, who you should be with. At the time things started happening for me, it was popular to be the squeaky-clean, cookie-cutter pop singer. But that role didn't speak to me, because it's so boring and superficial".

Recording and production
In late 2001, Aguilera started recording material for her fourth studio album. The recording sessions took place in studios around California and New York City, including Electric Lady Studios and The Hit Factory in New York City, The Enterprise Studios in Burbank, and Conway Recording Studios, Record Plant and NRG Recording Studios in Los Angeles. According to Aguilera, the recording sessions were much longer than she thought they would be. She further explained that many issues arose during that time, including her first breakup with her first boyfriend Jorge Santos. Aguilera also believed that the lyrics of Stripped were so personal, and her vocals "represent a rawer, more bare-bones approach as well, with less of the ostentatious riffing that has miffed critics in the past". She stated, "I did the vocal gymnastics thing because it was fun. That's why I like blues, too, because you can experiment more with that side of your voice. But I thought the lyrics on this record are so personal, deep and good that I wanted to make them stand out more than what I could do with my voice technically".

On Stripped, Aguilera enlisted a wide range of songwriters and producers, including Alicia Keys, Scott Storch, and Linda Perry. Perry was one of the biggest influences to Aguilera during the making of the album. The singer stated, "She taught me that imperfections are good and should be kept because it comes from the heart. It makes things more believable and it's brave to share them with the world." Keys was featured on the track "Impossible", which was recorded at Electric Lady Studios in New York City. Another notable producer is Storch; he wrote and produced a total of seven songs from Stripped, including two singles. He stated that during the making of Stripped, Aguilera was one of his friends that he cared most. However, Storch did not produce her fifth studio album Back to Basics (2006), which started a feud between the two artists, which was stated by Aguilera in one of the track from Back to Basics, "F.U.S.S. (Interlude)".

Music and lyrics
Musically, Stripped is a pop and R&B record which incorporates elements of many different genres, including soul, hip hop, heavy metal, rock, rock and roll, gospel, and Latin. The album broke her teen pop root from her self-titled debut studio album (1999). According to Aguilera, she wanted to be "real" in her next records because she was "overworked" at the time she was "a part of the big craze pop phenomenon". Multiple critics criticized its musical style, calling it a lack of musical concentration. On Stripped, Aguilera became the writer of most of the songs. She also revealed that Perry's songwriting on Pink's second studio album Missundaztood (2001) inspired Aguilera a lot. She further commented: "I wasn't a big fan of the Dallas Austin songs, but I really, really loved the Linda Perry song".

The album's opening track "Stripped Intro" describes her musical changes as she sings: "Sorry that I speak my mind / Sorry don't do what I'm told". The follow-up "Can't Hold Us Down" featuring Lil' Kim is an R&B and hip hop song which incorporates elements from dancehall toward its end. Lyrically, it talks about the theme of feminism, and was suggested that it is toward rapper Eminem and Fred Durst. The third track "Walk Away" is a piano ballad where she uses a "clever" metaphor to talk about an abusive relationship. It is followed by the fourth track and third single from Stripped, "Fighter", which incorporates strong elements from heavy metal and arena rock. It talks about a woman wants to thank a man who has done something wrong to her, and was inspired by Aguilera's unhappy childhood. It is followed-up by the interlude "Primer Amor Interlude", the Latin pop and flamenco track "Infatuation", and the interlude "Loves Embrace Interlude", respectively.

"Loving Me 4 Me" is a "sultry" classic R&B and neo soul ballad. The follow-ups "Impossible" and "Underappreciated" explore jazz and funk. The first of these, featuring Keys, incorporates a piano theme, while the second talks about the pain of a breakup. The piano ballad "Beautiful", which talks about the theme of self-respect, was deemed as the album's highlight by many critics, who praised its overall production. The next track "Make Over" is a salsa and dance-rock song that features a garage-rock beat. It was sued in the United Kingdom for illegally sampling the Sugababes' song "Overload" (2000), The Guardian also noted similarities between the two songs. Later, the American Society of Composers, Authors and Publishers (ASCAP) added the songwriting credits of Sugababes to the song. "Cruz" is a rock ballad that is musically similar to works of Michael Bolton. "Soar" is one of two tracks written for Stripped by Rob Hoffman and Heather Holley centered around themes of self-empowerment. The second track "I Will Be" is the B-side to "Dirrty" in the UK. The two next tracks, "Get Mine, Get Yours", a pop song with rock and soul influences, and "Dirrty", a dance-pop/urban anthem that talks about the theme of sexual intercourse, and have been described as "majestically filthy". The latter is the remake of Redman's "Let's Get Dirty (I Can't Get in da Club)" (2001), and also features the rapper. The follow-up is the interlude "Stripped Pt. 2". The empowering ballad "The Voice Within" talks about trusting oneself. "I'm OK" is a ballad which incorporates strings and discusses Aguilera's abusive childhood with her father, and the final song from the album "Keep on Singin' My Song" incorporates elements from drum and bass with a gospel choir.

Release and promotion

Stripped was first released internationally on October 22, 2002 and in the United States a week later by RCA Records. Promotion for Stripped started on October 28, when Aguilera appeared at a Chicago radio station B96's Halloween Bash and performed four songs from the album–"Dirrty", "Get Mine, Get Yours", "Beautiful" and "Impossible". The same day, Aguilera performed "Beautiful" on the Late Show with David Letterman, wearing a black gown, a black fedora, and black heels. She also performed "Dirrty" and "Beautiful" on Top of the Pops; the show aired in October. On November 1, Aguilera appeared on Today and performed "Beautiful" and "Impossible". On November 4, Aguilera was invited as a guest on The Daily Show to promote Stripped. At the 2002 MTV Europe Music Awards on November 14, Aguilera performed "Dirrty" with rapper Redman, recreating the stage as a boxing ring while entering the stage riding a motorcycle and wearing chaps during the performance, as seen in the music video for the song. On December 15, she performed "Dirrty" at the 2002 VH1 Awards. On January 13, 2003, Aguilera performed "Beautiful" and "Impossible" at the American Music Awards of 2003 (January). Aguilera gave a performance of "Beautiful" on Saturday Night Live on March 15, where she also sang "Fighter". At the 2003 MTV Video Music Awards on August 23, Aguilera performed with Madonna, Britney Spears and Missy Elliott a medley of Madonna's songs "Like a Virgin" and "Hollywood", and Elliott's "Work It". Towards the end of "Hollywood", Madonna kissed both Aguilera and Spears during the performance, making huge tabloid stories and fuss from the public, and marking it as one of the most iconic performances from the MTV Video Music Awards history. Later that night, she also performed "Dirrty" and "Fighter" with Redman and guitarist Dave Navarro. On January 16, 2004, she performed "Walk Away" on the Late Show with David Letterman. On February 8, Aguilera performed "Beautiful" at the 46th Annual Grammy Awards, where she also won a Grammy Award for Best Female Pop Vocal Performance for the song.

Aguilera also supported Stripped by embarking on two separate tours. In summer 2003, Justin Timberlake and Aguilera embarked on The Justified & Stripped Tour, which took place in North America. Talking about the tour, Timberlake said "[Aguilera]'s got one of the most amazing voices I've ever heard. That homegirl can sing ... this is why I am standing here". Several tour dates were canceled and rescheduled due to the collapse of lighting systems. An extended play entitled Justin & Christina was released exclusively at Target in July 2003 to promote the tour. The EP contains four remixes of Aguilera and Timberlake's songs from their respective albums, and two new tracks. In late 2003, Aguilera embarked on The Stripped Tour, the former's extension without Timberlake's acts. The tour took place in Europe, Japan and Australia. The former grossed a total of US$30,261,670, becoming the 16th highest-grossing tour of 2003. In May 2004, Aguilera was expected to return to North America during the second leg of The Stripped Tour. However, the 29 tour dates were canceled last-minute due to the singer's vocal strain. On January 13, an accompanying live video album of the tour, titled Stripped Live in the UK, was released worldwide. On December 8, a compilation album including both Stripped and Stripped Live in the UK was released in the United Kingdom.

20th Anniversary
On October 21, 2022, for the album's twentieth anniversary, Aguilera released a deluxe edition of the album with two new tracks: "I Will Be" (the b-side to "Dirrty") and the Benny Benassi remix of "Beautiful". This was announced alongside new vinyl releases, HD remasters for music videos and a new music video for "Beautiful" which premiered on October 19, 2022.

Singles 
"Dirrty" was serviced as the lead single from the album on September 3, 2002. Perry and Aguilera's management wanted to release "Beautiful" as the lead single. However, Aguilera wanted to release a seriously "down and dirty" song to announce her comeback, so RCA Records decided to release it as the first single. Upon its release, the song received mixed to negative reviews from critics; some of whom criticized its sound and negatively compared it to Britney Spears' song "I'm a Slave 4 U" (2001), while the others chose it as a standout track from Stripped. Its accompanying music video, directed by David LaChapelle, was criticized due to its sexual content, and sparked protests in Thailand. However, it was an international hit, achieving certifications in Australia, New Zealand, Switzerland, and the United Kingdom.

The album's second single "Beautiful" was written solely by Perry. Rush-released following the commercial underperformance and controversy surrounding previous single "Dirrty", "Beautiful" received universal acclaim from music critics. Commercially, the single gained impact on charts worldwide, peaking within the top five in many countries, as well as achieving certifications in the United States, Australia, New Zealand and the United Kingdom. Its music video, directed by Jonas Åkerlund, garnered critical acclaim from media outlets by touching on anorexia nervosa, homosexuality, bullying, self-esteem, and transgender issues. The video was honored at the 14th GLAAD Media Awards (2003) due to its positive portrayal of the LGBT community. "Beautiful" was listed as one of the greatest songs throughout the 2000s decade by Rolling Stone and VH1.

"Fighter" was released as the third single from Stripped on March 10, 2003. The single was well received by most critics, as well as achieving chart success in several countries and certifications in the United States, United Kingdom and Australia. Its accompanying music video, directed by Floria Sigismondi, was inspired by the director's dark theatrics and moths.

The album's fourth single "Can't Hold Us Down", featuring Lil' Kim, was released on July 8, 2003. It garnered mixed reviews from music critics, and gained moderate success commercially, receiving a gold certification in Australia. Its accompanying music video was directed by LaChapelle.

"The Voice Within" was released on October 27, 2003 as the fifth and final single. Critics complimented the simple piano ballad, which talks about the theme of self-respect. Its accompanying music video was directed by LaChapelle.

"Infatuation" was released as a promotional single in Spain on September 22, 2003. "Walk Away" peaked at number 35 in Denmark on March 14, 2008, despite never being released as a single.

Critical reception

Stripped received generally mixed reviews from music critics. At Metacritic, which assigns a normalized rating out of 100 to reviews from mainstream critics, the album received an average score of 55, based on 14 reviews. Billboard was positive toward the album, writing that the album is "a must-heard recording rich with pleasantly surprising depth". In a mixed review, E! Online wrote, "If she had just shown up and sang her ass off, Stripped would've been a better show". Josh Kun from Spin commented, "As an artistic statement, Stripped is all over the place;it's a move toward hip-hop, it's a move toward rock, it's ghetto, it's Disney". Jancee Dunn of Rolling Stone provided a three-out-of-five-stars rating for the album, calling it "almost" an album for grown-ups, yet criticized its lack of musical concentration. Blender wrote a mixed review, yet commenting that it is better than Britney Spears' works. Writing for BBC Music, Jacqueline Hodges said that the album "is as full-on bold and over the top as most of Christina's outfits ... much of this seems to be an exercise in stretching the vocal chords [sic] to weak backing tracks". Jim Wirth for NME commented that Stripped is a "Mariah Carey album" comparing it to Carey's 1999 Rainbow. Sal Cinquemani from Slant Magazine commented that the album is "so overproduced and overwrought that it could easily pass for a Janet album".

In a negative review, The Village Voice criticized the album as a "nü-Mariah on mood stabilizers, extended with pseudo-pastiches of semi-popular songs". Todd Burns for Stylus Magazine was also negative toward the album, giving it an "F" score and wrote: "in between ten to twelve mediocre/good songs, we have eight to ten songs that would be better served as B-sides". Q provided a two-out-of-five-stars rating and commented that "Sadly, bra-burning rhetoric and gospel warbling make poor substitutes for addictive songs". AllMusic's editor Stephen Thomas Erlewine also wrote a negative review, commenting that the album is "the sound of an artist who was given too much freedom too early and has no idea what to do with it". Writing for The New York Times, Jon Pareles also provided a negative review, commenting that Stripped "is a blast of excess that risks alienating Ms. Aguilera's old fans without luring new ones, and it's bursting with misguided energy".

Accolades 

|-
! scope="row"| 2003
| Grammy Award
| Best Pop Collaboration with Vocals
| "Dirrty"
| 
| style="text-align:center;"| 
|-
! scope="row"| 2003
| GLAAD Media Award
| Special Recognition
| "Beautiful"
| 
| style="text-align:center;"| 
|-
! scope="row"| 2003
| Teen Choice Award
| Choice Music – Album
| Stripped
| 
| style="text-align:center;"| 
|-
! scope="row" rowspan="4"| 2003
| rowspan="4"| MTV Video Music Award
| Best Female Video
| rowspan="6"| "Dirrty"
| 
| rowspan="4" style="text-align:center;"| 
|-
| Best Pop Video
| 
|-
| Best Dance Video
| 
|-
| Best Choreography
| 
|-
! scope="row" rowspan="2"| 2003
| MOBO Award
| Video of the Year
| 
| style="text-align:center;"| 
|-
| Q Award
| Song of the Year
| 
| style="text-align:center;"| 
|-
! scope="row" rowspan="2" | 2003
| rowspan="2"| MTV Europe Music Award
| Best Album
| Stripped
| 
| rowspan="2" style="text-align:center;"| 
|-
| Best Song
| "Beautiful"
| 
|-
! scope="row" rowspan="4" | 2004
| rowspan="4"| Grammy Award
| Best Pop Vocal Album
| Stripped
| 
| rowspan="4" style="text-align:center;"| 
|-
| Song of the Year
| rowspan="2" | "Beautiful"
| 
|-
| Best Female Pop Vocal Performance
| 
|-
| Best Pop Collaboration with Vocals
| "Can't Hold Us Down"
| 
|-
! scope="row"| 2004
| MTV Asia Award
| Favorite Video
| "Beautiful"
| 
| style="text-align:center;"| 
|-
! scope="row"| 2004
| Brit Award
| Best International Album
| rowspan="2"| Stripped
| 
| style="text-align:center;"| 
|-
! scope="row" rowspan="2" | 2004
| rowspan="2"| Juno Award
| International Album of the Year
| 
| rowspan="2" style="text-align:center;"| 
|-
| Video of the Year
| "Fighter"
| 
|-
! scope="row" rowspan="3"| 2004
| rowspan="3"| MTV Video Music Award
| Best Female Video
| rowspan="3"| "The Voice Within"
| 
| rowspan="3" style="text-align:center;"| 
|-
| Best Cinematography
| 
|-
| Viewer's Choice
| 
|}

Commercial performance
Stripped debuted at number two on the US Billboard 200 with first-week sales of 330,000 copies, only behind Eminem's 8 Mile: Music from and Inspired by the Motion Picture, which debuted at number one with first-week sales of 702,000 copies. The album stayed on the chart until 2004, and was certified five times platinum by the Recording Industry Association of America (RIAA). By December 2009, Nielsen SoundScan reported that Stripped had sold 4,234,000 copies in the country, becoming her second highest-selling album in the United States, only behind her self-titled debut studio album (1999), which had sold 8,207,000 copies. As of 2018, the album has sold over 4,423,000 copies in the country alone. In Canada, Stripped debuted at number three on the Canadian Albums Chart with first-week sales of 14,000 copies, and was eventually certified triple platinum by Music Canada.

Elsewhere, Stripped was a sleeper hit, debuting low in many countries and eventually turning into a commercial success. In the United Kingdom, the album debuted at number 19 on the UK Albums Chart, peaking at number two. It became Aguilera's best-performing album in the country, spending 102 weeks within the top 100 of the chart, and was certified sextuple platinum by the British Phonographic Industry (BPI). The album became the 29th bestselling album there throughout the 2000s decade in the United Kingdom, also becoming the second highest-selling album by an American female artist in the country during the decade, only behind Norah Jones' Come Away with Me (2002). As of 2006, the album had sold 1,850,852 copies in the United Kingdom, and was ranked at number 73 on the list of 100 bestselling albums in the United Kingdom during the same time. As of April 2021, Stripped has sold a total of 2,050,000 copies in the United Kingdom. In March 2015, the Official Charts Company (OCC) revealed that Stripped had become the 40th bestselling album of the millennium in the country.

Throughout Europe, Stripped also peaked within the top ten in several countries, including Denmark, Germany, Ireland, the Netherlands, Norway, Scotland, and Switzerland. It was one of the bestselling albums in Poland in the first half of 2003. Stripped was certified triple platinum in Europe by the International Federation of the Phonographic Industry (IFPI) for shipping over three millions copies in the continent and was the bestselling pop album by a female artist of 2003. In Oceania, Stripped  debuted at number thirty-three on the Australian ARIA Albums chart on November 10, 2002 before falling off the chart the following week. It re-entered on January 19, 2003 at number 41 due to the promotion and success of the album's second single "Beautiful", and reached the top ten on the chart eight week later, it peaked at number seven in October 2003 and spent a total of 67 weeks on the chart. The success of the album was aimed by its five singles that reached the Australian ARIA Singles chart's top ten, as "Beautiful" reached number-one, and became her second number-one single there, "Dirrty" peaked at number four, while "Fighter" and "Can't Hold Us Down" both reached number 5, and "The Voice Within" reached number eight. In New Zealand, Stripped entered the albums chart at number 48 on February 23, 2003 but exited the chart the following week before its re-entry at number 26 on March 16, 2003 due the success of "Beautiful", and reached number five which became its peak position four week later. It spent 46 weeks on the chart and became Aguilera's longest-charting album there. It was certified quadruple platinum by the Australian Recording Industry Association (ARIA) for shipments of 280,000 copies in the country, and was certified double platinum by the Recorded Music NZ (RMNZ), shipping over 30,000 copies in the country. According to the RIAA, Stripped sold over 12 million copies worldwide.

Legacy and influence 

Following its release and five successful singles, Stripped became one of Aguilera's strongest charting albums. In the United States, the album became the tenth bestselling album of 2003, and Aguilera was ranked as the most successful female pop artist of the year with six chart entries. Likewise, Aguilera was the fourth most successful female musical act on the US Billboard 200, and the thirteenth overall. Due to the successful single releases, the magazine ranked Aguilera as the second bestselling female singles artist on the US Billboard Hot 100, only behind Beyoncé, and the top female Mainstream Top 40 artist. In 2017, Billboard named Stripped as one of the most important albums of the 2000s, noting the cultural and sonic influence the album had on an array of artists including Rihanna, Demi Lovato, Miley Cyrus and Ariana Grande. They added that,Ultimately, Christina defining herself as Stripped was not an ode to her sexually empowered image, but representative of her peeling back layers and getting to the music and emotions that make up the vocal powerhouse as a human, including all her darkness, fears and insecurities.

Selena Gomez cited Stripped as an inspiration for her second studio album Revival (2015), saying: "That's one of my favorite albums and that was kind of what I started off Revival as, some sort of story. I mean, that album for her was incredible — 'Beautiful', 'Can't Hold Us Down', all of that — that's the stuff that I love". She added: "That was an album, that was complete on my record. I have 'Rise', 'Survivors', 'Revival', 'Kill Em with Kindness'. My stuff is full on, it's an album, it's a piece, it's something that I'm proud of." In an interview with People, Demi Lovato said that their album Tell Me You Love Me (2017) was inspired by Stripped. They stated that they "grew up listening to Christina Aguilera" and explained that they were "inspired by the black and white artwork". Sabrina Carpenter has also stated that after she heard the album, she "knew that [she] wanted to sing" and she began to see "songs as a part of what [she] could do to showcase and develop [her] own voice". The album was included in the book 1001 Albums You Must Hear Before You Die. Justin Myers of the Official Charts Company called the album "a phenomenon".

Despite the heavy criticism received upon release, Stripped has gone on to earn widespread acclaim, years after its release. The album's fifteenth anniversary in 2017 saw many critics reevaluate the album in their articles, praising the album's longevity, musicality, cohesion, and its lasting impact and influence in contemporary music. Vice writer Sophie Wilkinson stated in a retrospective review, "Say what you like about the flailing 'Dirrty' dance routines it spawned, but Christina Aguilera's sophomore album Stripped still has merits beyond the cliché of a former teen star removing her saccharine casing to reveal her womanhood". She added that the album relayed feministic messages and that "15 years on, the album still gives any woman the confidence to speak up and be heard, to take charge of her sexuality and ownership of her body, or even just sing along loud enough to amplify its messages".

In a Billboard article, Jeff Benjamin praised the album's ability to shift between genres and the personal content featured. He went on to say that Aguilera was continuing the legacy that "Aguilera helped build after the likes of Donna Summer, Madonna and Cher". Benjamin also praised Aguilera for her feminist sentiment on the album's second track and fourth single "Can't Hold Us Down", while maintaining an openly sexual image, noting that it was not expected of feminists to be sexual at the time of the album's release. Idolator praised Stripped for remaining a "cohesive and forward-thinking collection of songs" 15 years after its release and noted its impact in contemporary music, while also stating that Stripped became "the blueprint for divas making the transition from teen idol to adult pop star". That same year, The Fader named it one of the greatest, most "crucial" albums recorded by women.

Later that year, HuffPost noted that with Stripped, Aguilera led the charge at the beginning of the 21st century in influencing and introducing the next generation feminist rhetoric into pop culture. In 2018, the enduring impact of Stripped was noted by the Los Angeles Times and several other pop media outlets including Fuse, Genius and Vinyl with consensus; "Stripped proves as the blueprint for honest and raw female pop". Crack writer Emma Garland called the album a "re-introduction to Christina Aguilera on her own terms". She added that the album "is best measured by its cultural impact on those it was always intended for – a mass audience of young people who [...] had spent much of the late 90's and early 00's being patronised by an industry that served them dynamic but spiritually void bubblegum pop washed down with empowerment slogans from the Spice Girls".

Track listing

Notes
  signifies a vocal producer

Sample credits
 "Make Over" interpolates "Overload", as performed by the Sugababes. Later pressings of the album contain songwriting credits for Keisha Buchanan, Mutya Buena, Siobhán Donaghy, Felix Howard, Cameron McVey, Paul Simm and Jonathan Lipsey; these credits were absent on initial pressings of the album.
 "I'm OK" contains an audio sample performed by Ellen Muth and David Strathairn from Dolores Claiborne, a film based on the novel of the same name by Stephen King.

Personnel
Credits adapted from the liner notes of Stripped.

Production

Christina Aguilera – vocal producer
E. Dawk – vocal producer, co-writer
Ron Fair – executive producer, A&R
Scott Storch – producer
Linda Perry – producer, engineer
Rob Hoffman – producer
Heather Holley – producer
Steve Morales – producer
Alicia Keys – producer
Glen Ballard – producer
Rockwilder – producer
Tony Black – recording
Oscar Ramirez – recording
Wassim Zreik – recording
Shane Stoner – recording
David Guerrero – engineer, assistant mix engineer
Dylan Dresdow – engineer, mix engineer
Andrew Chavez – assistant engineer, assistant mix engineer
Davy Vain – assistant engineer, Pro Tools engineer
Brian Douglas – assistant engineer
Alex Gibson – assistant engineer
Jay Goin – assistant engineer
Mark Kizula – assistant engineer
Aaron Leply – assistant engineer
John Morichal – assistant engineer
Rafael Serrano – assistant engineer
Kevin Szymanski – assistant engineer
Scott Whitting – assistant engineer
Tony Maserati – mixing
Peter Mokran – mixing
Dave Pensado – mixing
Rich Balmer – assistant mix engineer
Tony Flores – assistant mix engineer
Anthony Kilhoffer – assistant mix engineer
Jamie Sickora – assistant mix engineer
Ethan Willoughby – assistant mix engineer
Jolie Levine-Aller – production coordinator
Stephanie Kubiak – production assistant
Joann Tominaga – music contractor
Brian Gardner – mastering
Jeri Heiden – art direction & design
Glen Nakasako – art direction & design
Miranda Penn Turin – photography

Musicians

Christina Aguilera – lead vocals, background vocals
Lil' Kim – featured vocals
Redman – featured vocals
Alicia Keys – additional vocals, backing vocals, piano, other instruments
E. Dawk – vocals producer & arranger, choir vocals arrangement
Balewa Muhammad – vocals producer and arranger
Maxi Anderson – background vocals, choir vocals arrangement
Alexandra Brown – background vocals
Crystal Drummer – background vocals
Charlean Hines – background vocals
Erica King – background vocals
Nolie Robinson – background vocals
Alfie Sillas – background vocals
Toya Smith – background vocals
Maxine Waters-Willard – background vocals
Linda Perry – bass, guitar, piano, strings arrangement & conduction, music programming
Alex Al – bass
Uriah Duffy – bass
Mike Elizondo – bass
Rufus Jackson – bass
Tarus Mateen – bass
Steve Morales – drum programming, arranger
Matt Chamberlain – drums
Brian Frasier-Moore – drums
Kameron Houff – drums
Paul John – drums
Brian McLeod – drums
Mike Stinson – drums
Ahmir Thompson – drums
Darryl Dixon – horns
Gary Grant – horns
Jerry Hey – horns
Daniel Higgins – horns
Fred Maxwell – horns
Bill Reichenbach – horns
David Watson – horns
Rob Hoffman – guitar, programming, orchestral percussion, rhodes
Glen Ballard – guitar, arranger, keyboardist
Aaron Fishbein – guitar, electric guitar
John Goux – guitar
Michael Landau – guitar
Dave Navarro – guitar
Arthur White – guitar
Dwayne Wiggins – guitar
Ramon Stagnaro – acoustic guitar
Damon Fox – keyboards
Randy Kerber – keyboards
David Siegel – keyboards
Greg Phillinganes – piano
Richard Dodd – cello
Lily Haydn – viola, violin
Shanti Randall – viola
Eric Gorfain – violin
Larry Gold – strings arrangement & conduction
Ron Fair – strings arrangement
Bill Ross – orchestra arrangement
Anson Dawkins – choir vocals arrangement
Eric Dawkins – choir vocals arrangement

Charts

Weekly charts

Year-end charts

Decade-end charts

Certifications and sales

Release history

See also 
 List of best-selling albums by women
 List of best-selling albums of the 2000s (decade) in the United Kingdom
 List of best-selling albums of the 2000s (century) in the United Kingdom

Notes

References

Bibliography

External links
 Stripped at Discogs (list of releases)

Christina Aguilera albums
2002 albums
Albums produced by Glen Ballard
Albums produced by Linda Perry
Albums produced by Rockwilder
Albums produced by Scott Storch
Albums produced by Alicia Keys
Albums recorded at Electric Lady Studios
RCA Records albums
Albums recorded at Henson Recording Studios